Mont-Alexandre is an unorganized territory in the Gaspésie–Îles-de-la-Madeleine region of Quebec, Canada.

This  peak was named after an Indian trapper, Alexander, who visited the area in the first half of the 19th century.

Demographics

Population

See also
 List of unorganized territories in Quebec

References

Unorganized territories in Gaspésie-Îles-de-la-Madeleine